Brian Hunter may refer to:

Brian Hunter (outfielder) (born 1971), American baseball outfielder who played in the 1990s
Brian Hunter (first baseman) (born 1968), American baseball infielder who played in the 1990s
Brian Hunter (trader) (born 1974), Canadian natural gas trader associated with Amaranth Advisors and Solengo Capital